Charles Hedley (27 February 1862 – 14 September 1926) was a naturalist, specifically a malacologist. Born in Britain, he spent most of his life in Australia. He was the winner of the 1925 Clarke Medal.

Early life
Hedley was born in the vicarage at Masham, Yorkshire, England, the son of the Rev. Canon Thomas Hedley and his wife Mary, née Bush. On account of delicate health Hedley had only two years at Eastbourne College, but his education was continued by his father, a fellow of Trinity College, Cambridge.  He was mainly educated in the south of France; from boyhood he collected mollusc shells, and was greatly influenced by a French work on molluscan anatomy. In France he met George French Angas who gave him a letter of introduction to Dr. George Bennett of Sydney.

Exploring in Oceania
In 1881 Hedley went to New Zealand and in September 1882 to Sydney. He was suffering from asthma and after trying the dry interior found he was in better health when near the sea. He took up an oyster lease at Moreton Bay, Queensland, and then tried fruit-growing at Boyne Island, Port Curtis. His first published paper, "Uses of Some Queensland Plants", was published in the Proceedings of the Royal Society of Queensland in 1888, and in the same year he came to Brisbane. He did some voluntary work for the Queensland museum and on 1 January 1889 was appointed a supernumerary officer of it. In July he became honorary secretary of the Royal Society of Queensland, and in 1890, at the invitation of the administrator, Sir William Macgregor, he visited New Guinea, did some exploring, and made important collections. He was much interested in the natural history of New Guinea, but he contracted fever, and towards the end of 1890 he went to Sydney.

Study of molluscs
Hedley made Sydney his home for the rest of his life. In April 1891 he joined the Australian Museum staff as assistant in charge of land shells, and about five years later was appointed conchologist. Early in 1896 the local committee of the "Funafuti Coral Reef Boring Expedition of the Royal Society" (London) suggested to the trustees of the Australian museum that one of their officers should accompany the expedition, and Hedley was selected. He left in May, and during his stay on Funafuti made an interesting collection, particularly of Invertebrate and Ethnological objects. The descriptions of these were published in Memoir III of the Australian Museum Sydney between 1896 and 1900. Hedley himself was responsible for the "General Account of the Atoll of Funafuti", "The Ethnology of Funafuti" and "The Mollusca of Funafuti". In 1901 with Ernest Clayton Andrews Hedley examined the Queensland coast and Great Barrier Reef. He also contributed two articles in 1902 and 1903 on the "Mollusca" included in the Scientific Results of the Trawling Expedition of H.M.C.S. "Thetis", published as Memoir IV of the Australian Museum Sydney. Hedley collaborated with Professor William A. Haswell and Sir Joseph Verco in investigating the continental shelf and co-operated with the Commonwealth Advisory Council of Science and Industry.

Further travel and Australian Museum
Hedley was a keen explorer and visited most of the coast of eastern Australia, and the Gulf of Carpentaria, New Guinea, New Caledonia, and the Ellice Group. In later life he visited Canada and Alaska (1922), and Africa (1925). His chief interest was in the study of the Great Barrier Reef. He had become assistant curator of the Australian museum in 1908 and in 1920 he succeeded Robert Etheridge, Junior as principal keeper of collections. During this time he worked with Joyce Allan, from whom he obtained illustrations for his scientific papers. He resigned in 1925 to become scientific director of the Great Barrier Reef Investigation Committee. Between April and August 1926 he was supervising the sinking of a bore on Michaelmas Reef near Cairns, and he returned to Sydney in August intending to visit Japan in connexion with the third Pan-Pacific Science Congress. Not being well he decided to abandon the journey, and though it was hoped that a rest would restore his health, he died suddenly on 14 September 1926. He married and left a widow and an adopted daughter.

Awards and achievements
Hedley was on the council of the Linnean Society of New South Wales from 1897 to 1924 and was president from 1909 to 1911; he was on the council for 16 years of the Royal Society of New South Wales and was president in 1914; he was a vice-president of the Malacological Society of London from 1923. He was awarded the David Syme prize in 1916, and in 1925 received the Clarke Medal from the Royal Society of New South Wales. A man of invariable courtesy and kindliness, held in the highest regard by contemporary scientists, his knowledge was always at the disposal of younger naturalists and visiting scientists. His work, and especially in regard to the zoo-geographical history of the Pacific Ocean, gave him a high place among Australian zoologists. Hedley was the only man on the management committee of The Women's Co-operative Silk Growing and Industrial Association of New South Wales Limited, set up in 1893 with the aim of establishing a silk growing industry in New South Wales. A list of 156 published research papers written by Hedley, and 15 in association with others, was printed in 1924.

Bibliography 
 Hedley C. 1892. Art. XVIII.—An Enumeration of the Janellidae. Transactions and Proceedings of the Royal Society of New Zealand, Volume 25, pages 156–162.
 1896-1900 The atoll of Funafuti, Ellice group: its zoology, botany, ethnology, and general structure based on collections made by Mr. Charles Hedley, of the Australian museum, Sydney, N.S.W. Sydney. - Parts written by Charles Hedley include:
 Hedley C. 1896. Part I. - I. General account of the atoll of Funafuti. 1-72.
 Hedley C. 1897. Part IV. - XI. The Ethnology of Funafuti" and "The Mollusca of Funafuti. 227-306.
 Hedley C. 1899. Part VII. - XVII. The Mollusca of Funafuti Part I. 395-488.
 Hedley C. 1899. Part VIII. - XVIII. The Mollusca of Funafuti Part II. 489-511.
 Hedley C. 1899. Part IX. - XVII. The Mollusca of Funafuti (Supplement). 547-570.
 Hedley C. 1905. Art. XVI.—Results of Dredging on the Continental Shelf of New Zealand. Webster, W. H., Volume 38, 68-76.
 Hedley C. 1911. Part I. Mollusca. Pages 1-8, plate 1. In: Murray J (ed.) 1911. Vol. II. Biology. British Antarctic Expedition, 1907-9, under the command of Sir E.H. Shackleton, c.v.o. Reports on the scientific investigations. London.
  Hedley C. (1915), Studies on Australian Mollusca. Part XII; Proceedings of the Linnean Society of New South Wales v. 39
 Hedley C. 1916. Part V. Report on Mollusca. From Elevated Marine Beds, "Raised Beaches," of McMurdo Sound. pages 85-88. In: Benson W. L. et al. 1916. Geology. Vol. II. British Antarctic Expedition, 1907–9, under the command of Sir E.H. Shackleton, c.v.o. Reports on the scientific investigations. London.
  Charles Hedley, A revision of the Australian Turridae; Records of the Australian Museum 13 (1922)

References
This article incorporates public domain text from reference

External links 
 Works by Charles Hedley at the New Zealand Electronic Text Centre

1862 births
1926 deaths
Australian malacologists
Australian zoologists
English emigrants to Australia
People educated at Eastbourne College
Members of the Linnean Society of New South Wales
Royal Society of Queensland
People from Masham